Semifreddo is a class of frozen desserts similar to ice cream. The main ingredients are egg yolks, sugar, and cream.
It has the texture of frozen mousse or cake. The dessert's Spanish counterpart is called semifrío. 
It was created around the 19th century, but did not gain popularity until the early 20th century.

The parfait differs in that the Italian meringue is missing, which is replaced with pâte à bombe.

The biscotto ghiacciato instead contains Italian meringue, semi-whipped cream and fruit puree.

See also 
 Frozen custard
 List of custard desserts
 List of Italian desserts

References 

Frozen desserts
Italian desserts
Custard desserts